Maria Reva is a Canadian writer. She is most noted for her short story collection Good Citizens Need Not Fear, which was a shortlisted finalist for the 2020 Rogers Writers' Trust Fiction Prize.

Born in Ukraine, Reva moved to Canada with her family in childhood, and grew up in Vancouver, British Columbia. Good Citizens Need Not Fear, her debut collection, was based in part on family stories of life in Soviet-era Ukraine.

An MFA graduate of the University of Texas, Reva won the RBC Bronwen Wallace Award for Emerging Writers in 2018 for her short story "The Ermine Coat". Her work has also been published in The Atlantic, McSweeney's and the Best American Short Stories anthologies.

References

21st-century Canadian short story writers
21st-century Canadian women writers
Canadian women short story writers
Ukrainian emigrants to Canada
Writers from Vancouver
University of Texas alumni
Living people
Year of birth missing (living people)